Lenovo Legion is a line of consumer-oriented laptops and desktop computers designed, developed and marketed by Lenovo, targeting gaming performance. The first Legion brand laptops, the Legion Y520 and the Legion Y720, were revealed at CES 2017. On June 6, 2017, a high-performance model, the Legion Y920, equipped with Intel's seventh-generation quad-core i7-7820HK and Nvidia GTX 1070 discrete graphics, was launched.

At E3 2018, Lenovo announced three new laptops with new redesigned chassis, Y530, Y730 and Y7000.

In 2020, Lenovo launched the Legion 3, 5, and 7 laptops, where Legion 7 is the highest specification of the series.

Models 
This table lists all the existing models, their availability depends on the country.

See also 

 Lenovo ThinkPad
Lenovo IdeaPad
 HP Omen
 Dell Alienware
Intel Core
AMD Ryzen
Nvidia GeForce

References

External links 

 Official Website

Legion
Consumer electronics brands
Computer-related introductions in 2017
Products introduced in 2017
Gaming computers